Camille Decoppet (4 June 1862, in Suscévaz – 14 January 1925) was a Swiss politician and member of the Swiss Federal Council (1912–1919).

He was elected to the Federal Council on 17 July 1912 and handed over office on 31 December 1919. He was affiliated to the Free Democratic Party. 

During his office time he held the following departments:
 Department of Home Affairs (1912)
 Department of Justice and Police (1913)
 Military Department (1914–1919)
He was President of the Confederation in 1916.

External links

1862 births
1925 deaths
People from Jura-North Vaudois District
Swiss Calvinist and Reformed Christians
Free Democratic Party of Switzerland politicians
Members of the Federal Council (Switzerland)
Members of the National Council (Switzerland)
Presidents of the National Council (Switzerland)
University of Lausanne alumni